Old Turkish language may refer to:

 Old Anatolian Turkish language
 Old Turkic language
 Ottoman Turkish language

Language and nationality disambiguation pages